Filip Uriča (born 10 September 2003) is a Czech footballer who currently plays as a midfielder for Sigma Olomouc.

Career statistics

Club

Notes

References

2003 births
Living people
Czech footballers
Czech Republic youth international footballers
Association football midfielders
Czech First League players
Bohemian Football League players
SK Sigma Olomouc players